Vaceuchelus rapaensis is a species of sea snail, a marine gastropod mollusk in the family Chilodontidae.

Description

Distribution
This marine species occurs off the Austral Islands.

References

 Vilvens, C. (2017). New species and new records of Chilodontidae (Gastropoda: Vetigastropoda: Seguenzioidea) from the Pacific Ocean. Novapex, Hors Série. 11: 1-67.

External links

rapaensis
Gastropods described in 2017